The Power of Light may refer to:
 The Power of Light (film)
 The Power of Light (album)